The 2021 Chilean Primera División, known as Campeonato PlanVital 2021 for sponsorship purposes, was the 91st season of the Chilean Primera División, Chile's top-flight football league. The season began on 27 March and ended on 5 December 2021. Universidad Católica were the defending champions, and won their fourth straight title in the competition, and sixteenth overall, after a 3–0 away win over Everton on 4 December 2021, the last matchday of the season.

Format
In early February 2021, several bodies floated format proposals for the 2021 season, considering that the 2020 and 2021 editions of both the Copa Chile and Supercopa de Chile still needed to be played. ANFP considered playing a tournament with two stages, starting from late March. In the first stage, the 17 teams would play each other in a single round-robin tournament with the teams being split for the second stage in two groups: the top eight teams would play against each other for the championship, four Copa Libertadores berths and two Copa Sudamericana ones, while the remaining nine teams would play to avoid relegation, with the top team of that group also qualifying for the Copa Sudamericana. Three teams would be relegated: two teams directly and another one in a play-off. Meanwhile, the players union Sifup proposed to play a double round-robin tournament from April to December with two relegations, the 2020 Copa Chile in the first semester of 2021 and a league cup involving the Primera División teams in the second semester, with league broadcaster TNT Sports supporting a double round-robin tournament, or two short tournaments with play-offs in case the long tournament proposal was not feasible.

On 2 March 2021, ANFP's Council of Presidents voted to approve the format for the season. It was eventually decided to play a double round-robin tournament with the top three teams after 34 rounds qualifying for the Copa Libertadores, with a fourth berth being awarded to the 2021 Copa Chile champions. The teams placed from fourth to seventh place will qualify for the Copa Sudamericana, while the bottom two teams were relegated to Primera B, with the team placed third-from-bottom playing a double-legged play-off against the winners of the Primera B play-offs.

Teams
17 teams took part in the league in this season, down by one from the previous season: 15 teams from the 2020 tournament, plus the 2020 Primera B champions Ñublense and Deportes Melipilla, winners of the Primera B promotion play-offs. Ñublense returned to the top flight after five and a half years, while Deportes Melipilla played in Primera División after 13 years. Both promoted teams replaced Coquimbo Unido, Deportes Iquique, and Universidad de Concepción, who were relegated to Primera B at the end of the 2020 season.

Stadia and locations

Notes

Personnel and kits

Managerial changes

Notes

Standings

Results

Top scorers

Source: Soccerway

Promotion/relegation play-off
The team placed 15th in the season table (Huachipato) played the winners of the Primera B play-offs (Deportes Copiapó) in a double-legged series, with the winner earning the right to play in the top flight for the following season.

Huachipato won 4–2 on aggregate and remained in Primera División.

See also
2021 Primera B de Chile
2021 Copa Chile

References

External links
Primera División on ANFP's website 

Chile
2021 in Chilean sport
2021 in Chilean football
Primera División de Chile seasons